Women & Songs 11 is the 11th album of the Women & Songs franchise.

Overview
Released on November 27, 2007, this 11th edition of Women & Songs packs another 19 tracks from female artists or groups.  The collection includes Rihanna's annual contribution, Shut Up and Drive.  The first American Idol winner, Kelly Clarkson, starts the collection off with Because of You (a song she later redid as a duet with Reba McEntire, thus breaking into the country genre).  Nelly Furtado contributes All Good Things while Chantal Kreviazuk submits All I Can Do.  Story of Your Life by Ali Slaight concludes the album.

Track listing
 Because of You (Kelly Clarkson/David Hodges/Ben Moody) [3:40]
(performed by Kelly Clarkson)
 Believe (Kara DioGuardi/Marti Frederiksen) [3:41]
(performed by Suzie McNeil)
 4 in the Morning (T. Kanal/Gwen Stefani) [4:14]
(performed by Gwen Stefani)
 All Good Things (Nelly Furtado/Hills, Nate/Chris Martin/Tim Mosley) [3:48]
(performed by Nelly Furtado)
 Good Enough (Amy Lee) [4:34]
(performed by Evanescence)
 Tell Me What We're Gonna Do Now (Lonnie Lynn/Tony Reyes/A. "Novel" Stevenson/Joss Stone) [3:42]
(performed by Joss Stone)
 Extraordinary (Mandy Moore/Deb Talan/Steve Tannen) [2:54]
(performed by Mandy Moore)
 Seven Day Fool (Tyran Carlo/Berry Gordy Jr./Sonny Woods) [3:24]
(performed by Jully Black)
 LDN (Lily Allen/Iyiola Babalola/Darren Lewis/Duke Reid) [3:11]
(performed by Lily Allen)
 What You Want (Hayley Sales) [3:26]
(performed by Hayley Sales)
 Silver Lining (Jenny Lewis) [3:36]
(performed by Rilo Kiley)
 Better (Regina Spektor) [3:10]
(performed by Regina Spektor)
 Hold On (Ed Case/KT Tunstall) [2:57]
(performed by KT Tunstall)
 Misery Business (Josh Farro/Hayley Williams) [3:31]
(performed by Paramore)
 Shut Up and Drive (Gillian Gilbert/Peter Hook/Stephen Morris/E. Rogers/C. Sturken/Bernard Sumner) [3:33]
(performed by Rihanna)
 All I Can Do (Chantal Kreviazuk/Raine Maida) [3:37]
(performed by Chantal Kreviazuk)
 Weak in the Knees (Serena Ryder) [4:17]
(performed by Serena Ryder)
 Nobody Else Will (Lucas Silveira) [4:49]
(performed by The Cliks)
 Story of Your Life (Rob Wells/Simon Wilcox) [3:22]
(performed by Ali Slaight)

Production credits
Mastering
Ted Carson

Photography
Andrew MacNaughtan
Sheryl Nields

Cover Photo
Anthony Mandler
Ivan Otis
Derrick Santini

References
 [ Women & Songs 11 at AllMusic]

2007 compilation albums